Scott Raymond Adams (born June 8, 1957) is an American author and cartoonist. He is the creator of the syndicated Dilbert comic strip, and the author of several nonfiction works of satire, commentary, and business. Dilbert gained national prominence during the downsizing period in 1990s America and reached a worldwide audience. Adams worked in various business roles before he became a full-time cartoonist in 1995. He writes in a satirical, often sarcastic way about the social and psychological landscape of white-collar workers in modern corporations. In addition, Adams has written books in various other areas, including the spiritual experiment God's Debris encapsulating a form of pandeism, and books on political and management topics, including Win Bigly: Persuasion in a World Where Facts Don't Matter.

In 2023, Dilbert was dropped by numerous newspapers and its distributor, Andrews McMeel Syndication, after Adams published a video which included comments about Black people that were widely characterized as racist. Adams plans to relaunch the strip as Dilbert Reborn on Locals in March 2023.

Early life and education
Adams was born on June 8, 1957 in Windham, New York, the son of Paul and Virginia (née Vining) Adams. He has described himself as "about half German" and also has English, Irish, Welsh, Scottish, Dutch, and a small amount of Native American ancestry. He was a fan of Peanuts comics while growing up and started drawing comics at age 6. He won a drawing competition at age 11.

Adams graduated from Windham-Ashland-Jewett Central School in 1975 and was the valedictorian of his class of 39 students. He remained in the area and earned a BA in economics from Hartwick College in 1979. He then moved to California and started work. In 1986, Adams earned an MBA from the University of California, Berkeley. Adams took Dale Carnegie Training and called it "life changing". He is a vegetarian.

Career

Office worker
Adams worked closely with telecommunications engineers at Crocker National Bank in San Francisco between 1979 and 1986. Upon joining the organization, he first worked as a teller. After four months in which he was twice held up at gunpoint, he entered a management training program. His positions included management trainee, computer programmer, budget analyst, commercial lender, product manager, and supervisor.

He later shifted to work at Pacific Bell. To devote time to developing a new career, he woke up every day at 4 a.m. and spent time at various endeavors; cartooning proved to be the most successful of them. Adams created Dilbert during this period of personal exploration. The Dilbert name was suggested by his former boss, Mike Goodwin. Dogbert, originally named Dildog, was loosely based on his family's deceased pet beagle Lucy. His submissions of Dilbert and other comic panels to various publications, including The New Yorker and Playboy, were not published, but an inspirational letter from a fan persuaded Adams to keep trying. He worked at Pacific Bell between 1986 and June 30, 1995, and the personalities he encountered there inspired many of his Dilbert characters. In 1989, while still employed at Pacific Bell, Adams launched Dilbert with United Media. To maintain his income, he continued to draw his cartoons during the early morning hours. His first payment for Dilbert was a monthly royalty check of $368.62. Dilbert gradually became more popular. It was syndicated in 100 newspapers in 1991 and 400 by 1994. Adams attributed his success to his idea of including his email address in the panels, which resulted in feedback and suggestions from readers.

Full-time cartoonist
Adams's success grew, and he became a full-time cartoonist as Dilbert reached 800 newspapers. In 1996, his first business book, The Dilbert Principle, was released. It expounded on his concept of the Dilbert principle.

In 1997, Adams won the National Cartoonists Society's Reuben Award for Outstanding Cartoonist and Best Newspaper Comic Strip. Logitech CEO Pierluigi Zappacosta invited Adams to impersonate a management consultant, which he did wearing a wig and false mustache. He tricked Logitech managers into adopting a mission statement that Adams described as "so impossibly complicated that it has no real content whatsoever". His writing in San Jose Mercury News West Magazine regarding the incident earned him an Orwell Award. By 2000, the comic was in 2,000 newspapers in 57 countries and 19 languages.

His comic strips were adapted as a Dilbert TV series, which debuted in January 1999 and ran for two seasons on UPN. Adams served as executive producer and showrunner, along with Seinfeld writer Larry Charles. The show earned a Primetime Emmy Award in 1999. On June 28, 2020, Adams asserted to his followers on Twitter that the show had been cancelled because he was White and UPN had made a decision to shift toward African-American viewers.

In addition to his cartoon work, Adams has written books in various other areas, including self-improvement and religion. His book God's Debris (2001) lays out a theory of pandeism, in which God blows itself up to see what will happen, which becomes the cause of our universe. In The Religion War (2004), Adams suggests that followers of theistic religions such as Christianity and Islam are subconsciously aware that their religions are false, and that this awareness is reflected in their consistently acting as if these religions, and their threats of damnation for sinners, are false. In a 2017 interview, Adams said that his books on religion, not Dilbert, would be his ultimate legacy.

Coffee with Scott Adams
In 2015, Adams wrote blog posts predicting that Donald Trump had a 98 percent chance of winning the presidency based on his persuasion skills, and he started writing about Trump's persuasion techniques. His pieces on this topic grew popular, so he started writing about it regularly.

Adams soon developed this as a daily video presentation called Coffee with Scott Adams, distributed to Periscope, YouTube, ScottAdamsSays.com, and Locals, where he covered topics such as current events, politics, persuasion, and routes to success.

Coffee with Scott Adams has featured guests such as Naval Ravikant, Ed Latimore, Dave Rubin, Erik Finman, Greg Gutfeld, Matt Gaetz, Ben Askren, Carpe Donktum, Mark Schneider, Steve Hsu, Michael Shellenberger, Carson Griffith, Shiva Ayyadurai, James Nortey, Clint Morgan, and Bjørn Lomborg. In 2018, Kanye West shared multiple clips on Twitter from a Coffee episode titled: "Scott Adams tells you how Kanye showed the way to The Golden Age. With Coffee." In 2020, President Trump retweeted an episode where Adams mocked Joe Biden.

Adams offers paid subscriptions for exclusive content on Locals. In 2020, Adams said: "For context, I expect my Dilbert income to largely disappear in the next year as newspapers close up forever. The coronavirus sped up that inevitable trend. Like many of you, I'm reinventing my life for a post-coronavirus world. The Locals platform is a big part of that."

Other
Adams was the CEO of Scott Adams Foods, Inc., makers of the Dilberito and Protein Chef. He sold off his intellectual property in this venture when the product failed in the marketplace. He was a restaurateur for a while, but exited that business.

Adams was a fan of the science fiction TV series Babylon 5. He appeared in the season 4 episode "Moments of Transition" as a character named "Mr. Adams" who hires former head of security Michael Garibaldi to locate his megalomaniacal dog and cat. He had a cameo in "Review", a third-season episode of the TV series NewsRadio, in which Matthew Brock (played by Andy Dick) becomes an obsessed Dilbert fan. Adams is credited as "Guy in line behind Dave and Joe in first scene".

Adams has been a guest on podcasts including Making Sense with Sam Harris, The Tim Ferriss Show, The James Altucher Show, The Ben Shapiro Show, The Rubin Report, Real Talk with Zuby and The David Pakman Show. He has appeared on Real Time with Bill Maher, Commonwealth Club of California, Fox News and Berkeley Haas. Adams was interviewed for Mike Cernovich's documentaries Silenced (2016) and Hoaxed (2019). In 2016, Adams contributed a chapter of life advice to Tim Ferriss's collection, Tools of Titans.

Views

Political and social views
Adams has often commented on political and social matters. In 2016 he wrote on his blog, "I don't vote and I am not a member of a political party." In 2007, he suggested that Michael Bloomberg would make a good presidential candidate. Before the 2008 presidential election he said, "On social issues, I lean libertarian, minus the crazy stuff." In December 2011 he said that if he were president, he would do whatever Bill Clinton advised him to do because that "would lead to policies that are a sensible middle ground." On October 17, 2012, he wrote, "While I don't agree with Romney's positions on most topics, I'm endorsing him for president." In a blog post from September 2017, Adams described himself as being "left of Bernie Sanders, but with a preference for plans that can work."

In 2015, although Adams stated that he would not endorse a candidate for the 2016 elections, he repeatedly praised Donald Trump's persuasion skills. He extensively detailed what he called Trump's "talent stack". Adams correctly predicted that Trump would win the Republican nomination and the general election. In 2018, Adams similarly praised the persuasion skills of Alexandria Ocasio-Cortez.

Of the 2016 Democratic National Convention, he said: "If you're an undecided voter, and male, you're seeing something different. You're seeing a celebration that your role in society is permanently diminished. And it's happening in an impressive venue that was, in all likelihood, designed and built mostly by men." Adams said that he temporarily endorsed Hillary Clinton out of fear for his own life, stating that he had received direct and indirect death threats ("Where I live, in California, it is not safe to be seen as supportive of anything Trump says or does. So I fixed that."). In late September, however, Adams switched his endorsement from Clinton to Trump. Among his primary reasons were his respect for Trump's persuasion skills, Clinton's proposal to raise the inheritance tax, and his concerns over Clinton's health. In mid-October, Adams predicted a Clinton victory would ensure that a male president would never again be elected. He has also stated that writing about Trump's powers of persuasion ended his public speaking career and reduced his income by about 40%, and that his number of friends had decreased by about 75%.

Adams predicted in March 2020 that Trump, Sanders and Joe Biden would all contract COVID-19 and that one of them would die from it by the end of the year; in December 2020, when all three men remained alive (although Trump did catch the virus), Politico named Adams' prediction one of "the most audacious, confident and spectacularly incorrect prognostications about the year." Adams received further attention in December 2021, in reference to his July 2020 prediction that if Biden were to win the 2020 presidential election, then Republicans would be hunted and there's a "good chance" they'll be "dead within a year" and "Police will stand down" — none of which ultimately occurred. On September 30, 2021, Adams had also tweeted "My worst prediction of all time was 'If Biden gets elected, there's a good chance you will be dead in a year.' It was closer to two years. I missed it by 100%", which also did not occur.

Adams has compared women asking for equal pay to children demanding candy. He pointed out "satanic coincidences" in the Joe Biden presidential campaign. In July 2022, Adams tweeted that if parents believe their son poses a danger to themselves and others, they have only two options, either they should murder their own son or watch him die and maybe kill others.

In January 2023, Adams announced that he was considering taking legal action against political cartoonist Ben Garrison for an allegedly defamatory cartoon about his view on masking and COVID-19 vaccines.

Views on race
On June 28, 2020, Adams said on Twitter that the Dilbert TV show was cancelled because he was White and UPN had decided to focus on an African-American audience, and that he had been "discriminated against".

In a series of comic strips in September 2022, Dilbert parodied environmental, social, and corporate governance (ESG) strategies. Part of the plotline involved an African-American character who "identifies as white" and the company management asking him if he could also identify as gay. According to Adams, the week of September 19, Dilbert was pulled from 77 newspapers owned by Lee Enterprises. Adams also claimed that the cancellation was coincidental.

On February 22, 2023, Adams responded to a poll by Rasmussen Reports, a pollster often cited by conservative media, that asked respondents if they agreed with the statement "It's okay to be white"; the Anti-Defamation League said the seemingly innocuous phrase began being used online in 2017 as part of an alt-right trolling campaign and is associated with the white supremacist movement. The poll showed 53% of Black respondents agreed with the phrase, 26% disagreed, and 21% were not sure. On a YouTube livestream of his Real Coffee with Scott Adams program, Adams, who said he was upset that nearly half did not agree, characterized Black people as a "hate group" and said, "the best advice I would give to White people is to get the hell away from Black people; just get the fuck away." His comments were widely characterized as racist. In response to these and other related comments, Dilbert was dropped by numerous newspapers across the country, including the Los Angeles Times, The Washington Post, and USA Today-affiliated newspapers.  Andrews McMeel Syndication, the distributor of Dilbert, announced on February 27, 2023, that it was severing all ties with Adams. Portfolio, his book publisher, announced it was dropping his non-Dilbert book that was scheduled for release in September 2023. In response to the incident, Adams said his remarks were hyperbole and that the stories reported about them ignored the context; he conjectured that nobody would disagree with his main points and stated he disavowed racists. Adams announced that on March 13, 2023, the strip would return as Dilbert Reborn on the subscription website Locals.

Personal life
Adams trained as a hypnotist. He credits affirmations for many of his achievements, including scoring in the ninety-fourth percentile on a difficult qualification exam for business school, and creating Dilberts success. He states that the affirmations give him focus. He has described a method he has used that he says gave him success: he pictured in his mind what he wanted and wrote it down 15 times a day on a piece of paper.

Since late 2004, Adams has suffered from focal dystonia, which has affected his ability to draw for lengthy periods.  He now draws on a graphics tablet. He also suffered from spasmodic dysphonia, a condition that causes the vocal cords to behave abnormally. In July 2008, he underwent surgery to reroute the nerve connections to his vocal cords, and his voice is completely functional.

Adams married Shelly Miles aboard a yacht, the Galaxy Commodore, on July 22, 2006, in San Francisco Bay, in a ceremony conducted by the ship's captain. The two had met at a gym in Pleasanton, California, where Miles was an employee and Adams was a customer. Adams was stepfather to Miles' two children, Savannah and Justin, the latter of whom died of a fentanyl overdose in 2018 at age 18, prompting Adams to start the service WhenHub. Adams and Miles divorced in 2014, and Adams said the two remained friends, with Miles moving only one block away after their separation.

On Christmas Day in 2019, Adams announced on his podcast that he was engaged to Kristina Basham, and later revealed that they had married on July 11, 2020.  Basham, a model and baker, has two daughters and is a vice president at WhenHub. On March 10, 2022, Adams announced on his YouTube podcast that he and Basham were getting divorced.

Recognition
Adams has received recognition for his work, including the National Cartoonists Society Reuben Award and Newspaper Comic Strip Award for 1997 for his work on Dilbert.  He climbed the European Foundation for Management Development (EFMD) rankings of the 50 most influential management thinkers, placing 31st in 2001, 27th in 2003, 12th in 2005, and 21st in 2007. He received the Orwell Award in 1998 for his participation in "Mission Impertinent" for San Jose Mercury News West Magazine.

In popular culture
Adams has coined several words and phrases over the years, including Confusopoly (businesses that stay afloat only by intentionally misleading their customers), the Dilbert principle (a variant on the Peter principle), Elbonia as shorthand for offshore work, and Pointy-Haired Boss (PHB) and Induhvidual as insults.

Stephen King references Dilbert in his 2000 book on how to write, On Writing: A Memoir of the Craft. King says: "And if you think it's all about information, you ought to give up fiction and get a job writing instruction manuals—Dilbert's cubicle awaits."

Adams is quoted in the book Steve Jobs by Walter Isaacson. Adams wrote a blogpost in 2010 about Steve Jobs' response to Antennagate, in which he says "Apple's response to the iPhone 4 problem didn't follow the public relations playbook, because Jobs decided to rewrite the playbook ... If you want to know what genius looks like, study Jobs' words." Jobs proudly emailed this around.

In 2018, Elon Musk sent his staff an email which said, "If following a 'company rule' is obviously ridiculous in a particular situation, such that it would make for a great Dilbert cartoon, then the rule should change."

Publications

Dilbert compilations
 Always Postpone Meetings with Time-Wasting Morons (1992)
 Shave the Whales (1994)
 Bring Me the Head of Willy the Mailboy! (1995)
 It's Obvious You Won't Survive by Your Wits Alone (1995)
 Still Pumped from Using the Mouse (1996)
 Fugitive from the Cubicle Police (1996)
 Casual Day Has Gone Too Far (1997)
 I'm Not Anti-Business, I'm Anti-Idiot (1998)
 Journey to Cubeville (1998)
 Don't Step in the Leadership (1999)
 Random Acts of Management (2000)
 Excuse Me While I Wag (2001)
 When Did Ignorance Become a Point of View? (2001)
 Another Day in Cubicle Paradise (2002)
 All Dressed Down and Nowhere to Go (2002) (Still Pumped from Using the Mouse, Casual Day Has Gone Too Far, and I'm Not Anti-Business, I'm Anti-Idiot combined)
 When Body Language Goes Bad (2003)
 Words You Don't Want to Hear During Your Annual Performance Review (2003)
 Don't Stand Where the Comet Is Assumed to Strike Oil (2004)
 The Fluorescent Light Glistens Off Your Head (2005)
 Thriving on Vague Objectives (2005)
 Try Rebooting Yourself (2006)
 Positive Attitude (2007)
 This Is the Part Where You Pretend to Add Value (2008)
 Dilbert 2.0: 20 Years of Dilbert (2008)
 Freedom's Just Another Word for People Finding Out You're Useless (2009)
 14 Years of Loyal Service in a Fabric-Covered Box (2009)
 I'm Tempted to Stop Acting Randomly (2010)
 How's That Underling Thing Working Out for You? (2011)
 Teamwork Means You Can't Pick the Side that's Right (2012)
 Your New Job Title Is "Accomplice" (2013)
 I Sense a Coldness to Your Mentoring (2013)
 Go Add Value Someplace Else (2014)
 Optimism Sounds Exhausting (2015)
 I'm No Scientist, But I Think Feng Shui Is Part of the Answer (2016)
 Dilbert Gets Re-accommodated (2017)
 Cubicles That Make You Envy the Dead (2018)
 Dilbert Turns 30 (2019)

Special compilations (annotated, favorites, etc.)
 Build a Better Life by Stealing Office Supplies: Dogbert's Big Book of Business (1991)
 Dogbert's Clues for the Clueless (1993)
 Seven Years of Highly Defective People (1997)
 Dilbert Gives You the Business (1999)
 A Treasury of Sunday Strips: Version 00 (2000)
 What Do You Call a Sociopath in a Cubicle? Answer: A Coworker (2002)
 It's Not Funny If I Have to Explain It (2004)
 What Would Wally Do? (2006)
 Cubes and Punishment (2007)
 Problem Identified: And You're Probably Not Part of the Solution (2010)
 Your Accomplishments Are Suspiciously Hard to Verify (2011)
 I Can't Remember If We're Cheap or Smart (2012)

Other Dilbert books
 Telling It Like It Isn't (1996)
 You Don't Need Experience If You've Got Attitude (1996)
 Access Denied: Dilbert's Quest for Love in the Nineties (1996)
 Conversations With Dogbert (1996)
 Work Is a Contact Sport (1997)
 The Boss: Nameless, Blameless and Shameless (1997)
 The Dilbert Bunch (1997)
 No You'd Better Watch Out (1997)
 Please Don't Feed the Egos (1997)
 Random Acts of Catness (1998)
 You Can't Schedule Stupidity (1998)
 Dilbert Meeting Book Exceeding Tech Limits (1998)
 Trapped in a Dilbert World: Book Of Days (1998)
 Work—The Wally Way (1999)
 Alice in Blunderland (1999)
 Dilbert Sudoku Comic Digest: 200 Puzzles Plus 50 Classic Dilbert Cartoons (2008)

Dilbert-related business publications
 Dilbert Newsletter (since 1994)
 The Dilbert Principle (1996)
 Dogbert's Top Secret Management Handbook (1996)
 The Dilbert Future (1997)
 The Joy of Work (1998)
 Dilbert and the Way of the Weasel (2002)
 Slapped Together: The Dilbert Business Anthology (2002) (The Dilbert Principle, The Dilbert Future, and The Joy of Work, published together in one book)
 Dilbert's Guide to the Rest of Your Life: Dispatches from Cubicleland (2007)

Non-Dilbert publications
 God's Debris (2001)
 The Religion War (2004)
 Stick to Drawing Comics, Monkey Brain! (2007)
 How To Fail at Almost Everything and Still Win Big (2013)
 Win Bigly: Persuasion in a World Where Facts Don't Matter (2017)
 Loserthink: How Untrained Brains Are Ruining America (2019)

References

External links

 
 Scott Adams Says at Periscope
 
 
 
 
 PR efforts for the October 2013 release of How to Fail at Almost Everything and Still Win Big
 
 

1957 births
Living people
21st-century American non-fiction writers
American bloggers
American comic strip cartoonists
American humorists
American male bloggers
American people who self-identify as being of Native American descent
American podcasters
American satirists
Artists from the San Francisco Bay Area
California Republicans
Dilbert
Haas School of Business alumni
Hartwick College alumni
New York (state) Republicans
People from Greene County, New York
People from the Catskills
Race-related controversies in comics
Reuben Award winners
Writers from California